The iRobot Negotiator is an unmanned robotic platform from the  iRobot Corporation.  The 34 lb (15.4 kg) robot designed for use in civil response operations by civil defense professionals such as SWAT teams, police officers, etc. 

iRobot Negotiator performs basic reconnaissance, thus increasing situational awareness. It travels at variable speeds up to 3.1 mph and has optional accessories for toxic chemical and radiological threat detection.

References

External links
 iRobot Corporation: Negotiator
 Negotiator Specifications

Unmanned ground combat vehicles
IRobot